My Story is the first Digital EP played by South Korean boy band Beast.

History
It includes three collaboration songs between BEAST members, plus a full version of their fourth mini-album intro track "Lights go on again". The collaboration tracks were released after BEAST held their first concert, WELCOME TO BEAST AIRLINE, and performed those live.

‘When the Door Closes’ which is a ballad track was released on December 21, 2010. On December 23, 2010, "Let It Snow" which is a pop and R&B track will be released.

Track listing

Release history

References

External links
 Beast Official website

Cube Entertainment EPs
Dance-pop EPs
Highlight (band) EPs
2010 EPs
Korean-language EPs